Vatica patentinervia is a tree in the family Dipterocarpaceae, native to Borneo. The specific epithet patentinervia means "widely divergent nerves", referring to the leaf veins.

Description

Distribution and habitat
Vatica patentinervia is endemic to Borneo.

Conservation
Vatica patentinervia has been assessed as critically endangered on the IUCN Red List. It is threatened by conversion of land, principally for palm oil plantations. The species population is estimated at fewer than 50 trees.

References

patentinervia
Endemic flora of Borneo
Plants described in 2002